Green River Rural LLG is a local-level government (LLG) of Sandaun Province, Papua New Guinea. It is located along the border with Keerom Regency, Papua Province, Indonesia.

Rivers
Rivers that flow through the LLG include the Samaia River.

Languages
Green River is one of the most linguistically diverse LLGs of Sandaun Province. Amto-Musan, Busa, Yalë, Kwomtari, Pauwasi, and other languages unrelated to each other are spoken in this LLG.

Wards
01. Abaru (Karkar language speakers)
02. Dieru
03. Hogru
04. Rawei (Busa language speakers)
05. Nagatiman (Nagatiman language speakers)
06. Dila
07. Marakwini
08. Wagu
09. Beimap
10. Seiawi (Siawi language speakers)
11. Amto (Amto language speakers)
12. Bisiabru
13. Idam 1
14. Idam 2
15. Hufi
16. Biake 1 (Pyu language speakers)
17. Kaiseiru
18. Sokmaiyon
19. Kobraru
20. Yabru
21. Buna
22. Mahanei
23. Mukuasi
24. Bifro
25. Baio
26. Yibru
27. Miniabru
28. Auiya 1 (Karkar language speakers)
29. Kambriap (Karkar language speakers)
30. Fonginum
31. Iuri 1
32. Tingirapu
33. Amini (Biaka language speakers)
34. Samunai
35. Miarfai
36. Biaka (Biaka language speakers)

References

Local-level governments of Sandaun Province